Castiglione Torinese is a comune (municipality) in the Metropolitan City of Turin in the Italian region Piedmont,  about  northeast of Turin.  
 
Castiglione Torinese borders the following municipalities: Settimo Torinese, Gassino Torinese, San Mauro Torinese, Baldissero Torinese, and Pavarolo.

References

External links
 Official website

Cities and towns in Piedmont